The Honda Prelude is a car produced by Japanese manufacturer Honda over five generations from 1978 to 2001. It was a two-door coupé and was loosely derived from the Honda Accord. The Prelude was used by Honda to introduce the Japanese Honda retail sales chain Honda Verno, with the international release of the model following shortly after. Production of the Prelude concluded in 2001 upon the introduction of the fourth-generation Integra. The Prelude name was originally trademarked by Toyota, but was amicably given to Honda for use. The Prelude complied with the series of music-themed vehicle names which Honda used at the time, along with the Accord, Quintet, Concerto, Jazz, and Ballade.

First generation (1978)

On 24 November 1978, the Prelude was launched to the Japanese market. It had its world premiere at the 1979 AutoRAI in Amsterdam, two months later. In Japan it was only available at the newly established dealership sales channel Honda Verno. This dealership chain also introduced the Honda Quint, the Honda Ballade, and the Accord-based Honda Vigor as its largest sedan and hatchback. The four-wheel independent struts, brakes, and engine were all borrowed from the first generation Accord, but the chassis was all new and developed by chief engineer Hiroshi Kizawa expressly for the sporting Prelude. At 4,090 mm (length) x 1,635 mm (width) x 1,290 mm (height), it had quite a low and wide profile. The wheelbase was 2,320 mm, and was 60 mm shorter than that of the original Accord. Honda appears to have followed the successful introduction of the Toyota Celica example by taking a small car, like the Accord, installing a more powerful engine, and giving the body a short trunk, and a long engine hood. The Prelude (and period Accord) were the first cars under two liters to receive standard power steering. The Prelude also benefited from Honda's experience with sporting cars like the Honda S800 and Coupé 1300.

The Prelude was the first Honda model to offer a power moonroof as standard equipment, which eventually became a Prelude trademark. In Japan, the Prelude was available with a sliding metal sunroof, while US versions received a glass top which freed up more headroom. Japanese buyers were liable for slightly more annual road taxes over the smaller Civic, which also had a smaller engine. While marketed as a 2+2, the rear seat was not usable for anyone larger than a small child.

Initial reviews for the Prelude were favorable. "It is," wrote Brock Yates for Motor Trend, "by any sane measurement, a splendid automobile. The machine, like all Hondas, embodies fabrication that is, in my opinion, surpassed only by the narrowest of margins by Mercedes-Benz. It is a relatively powerful little automobile by anybody's standards." Motor Trend measured an early Prelude completing the quarter-mile in 18.8 seconds at 70 mph. In terms of underpinnings it was mostly a Honda Accord, although its more compact package and lower weight allowed for a marginally higher top speed and gas mileage.

It remained the only engine available for most markets, aside from the US and Japan. It featured a non-automatic choke with three positions and a two-barrel carburetor. Automatics had five less horsepower. The EK engine made use of an engine oil cooler and transistor-controlled ignition system.

Transmission choices were either the standard five-speed manual or initially a two-speed "Hondamatic" semi-automatic, which by October 1979 had been replaced by a three-speed automatic that used the final gear as the overdrive. In addition to the standard fabrics offered in most models, an 'Executive' option was offered in some markets which added power steering and Connolly leather upholstery. Honda used a single central gauge cluster design in this car which housed the speedometer and tachometer in one combined unit where both instrument's needles swept along the same arc. They also placed the compact AM/FM radio unit up high next to the gauge cluster. The Prelude featured intermittent wipers, tinted glass, and a remote trunk release. 1980 saw the introduction of the CVCC-II engine which employed the use of a catalytic converter and several other refinements that improved driveability, the Prelude also received a mild facelift in 1981. This facelift meant a return to a more traditional dashboard, rather than the much critiqued "Concentrated Target Meter" used before. The 1981 Prelude also received a stainless steel trim strip along the bumpers and side moldings, as well as a new grille. 313,000 units were manufactured by Honda from 1978 to 1982, with 80% being sold outside of Japan.

The Prelude was introduced in Europe during 1979, but was not a strong seller, its high asking price not helping its chances of sales success.

Second generation (1982)

The second-generation Prelude was released in Japan on 25 November 1982 and worldwide in the spring of 1983. Riding on an all-new platform, the Prelude was initially available with an A18A or ET-2, 1.8 L 12-valve twin carburetor engine, producing 105 PS (77 kW). In Japan, Asia and Europe, it later became available with a 2-liter DOHC 16-valve PGM-FI engine (JDM = BA1, EU = BA2) although this engine was not released in Europe until 1986. The JDM B20A produced  at 6300 rpm, while the European B20A1 produced only . This was the first generation of Prelude to have pop-up headlights, which allowed for a more aerodynamic front clip, reducing drag. Opening the headlights, however, especially at higher speeds, produced significantly more drag. The design retained nothing of the first generation, being considerably more aerodynamic and with large glass surfaces. As with the predecessor, it was amply equipped, with an air of "mini-gran turismo" rather than that of a sports car. It also offered, as an option, Honda's new "A.L.B." anti-lock brakes.

In Japan, the Prelude was one of the key models sold at Japanese Honda dealership sales channels, called Honda Verno, which offered performance-oriented products. All Honda Verno products, like the Vigor, initially shared the concealed headlights introduced with this generation Prelude that would help identify "sports" products from Honda in Japan however, the approach was short-lived. The model with the 2.0 liter engine was regarded as the top level car in Japan because Japanese buyers were liable for a higher annual road tax over the car with the 1.8 liter engine. The Japanese 1.8 had CVCC and claimed , considerably more than export models.

When the 2-liter 16-valve DOHC engine came out the hood had to be slightly modified since the larger engine could not fit under the original hood. The original 1.8-liter engine was developed specifically for the Prelude to allow a low hoodline, even tilting the engine backward to make it lower yet. The European version also saw slight modifications to the rear lights and revised front and rear bumpers which were now color-matched. Due to the fairly low weight of the car and high power (the 16-valve engine produced  in Japanese trim), the car was relatively nimble in comparison to its competitors, which most Preludes had not been up to that time.

The North American 1983 model is identifiable by its standard painted steel wheels with bright trim rings (although alloy rims were optional). The 1984-87 base models had Civic-style full wheel covers. In Canada, a "Special Edition" trim was created, which is essentially the same as the USA 2.0Si "sport injected" model. Fuel injection was introduced in the "Si" models in 1985. North American 1.8's offered , while the later 2.0 has .

This version of the Prelude was far more popular in Britain than its predecessor, and sold well at a time when sports cars were declining in popularity and many manufacturers were withdrawing from this market sector; including Ford, who did not replace the Capri after its 1986 demise, even though it had been one of Britain's 10 most popular new cars as recently as 1980. The European lineup originally consisted of the base Prelude, without power steering, and the well-equipped EX which was also available with an automatic transmission and the A.L.B. brakes.

Third generation (1987)

On 9 April 1987, the third-generation Prelude was released in the Japanese domestic market and released later that year worldwide, being a 1988 model in North America. Featuring evolutionary styling from its predecessor, it shared design cues from the Honda NSX that would be introduced later in 1990. The Prelude featured innovative features for its time such as a 0.34 drag coefficient, roof pillars made of high-strength metal and its signature feature, the available option of the world's first mechanical four-wheel steering system available in a mass-production passenger car. Honda had expected 30% of buyers to plump for four-wheel-steering, but the car was a runaway success in the home market and 80% of buyers did in the first year.

The third-generation Prelude was exclusively powered by variants of the Honda B20A engine, a base carbureted version with a SOHC 12-valve valvetrain, or a DOHC variant with Honda's PGM-FI fuel injection and 16 valves. The engine was tilted backwards by 18 degrees, which made it possible to make the hood  lower than on the previous generation.

It was well received by judges of the European Car of the Year accolade for 1988, finished third in a contest where the Peugeot 405 was the runaway winner and the Citroën AX came second. This was one of the best performances by a Japanese built or branded car until the Nissan Micra won the award five years later.

The Prelude was Wheels magazine's Car of the Year for 1987.

Mid-cycle refresh and Prelude INX

The facelift third-generation Prelude was revealed in Japan on 21 November 1989. The front and rear bumpers were revised on the new Prelude. The rear front bumper and rear tail lights featured clear indicators and a revised parking light design. Many of the interior parts were also revised, including the dash bezel, the door handle and window switches. The Japanese version of the Si with the B20A was rated 140 PS  with the JDM engine and was rated for 37 MPG.

Along with the facelift, a new Prelude model was introduced to the Japanese domestic market, the Prelude INX.  It featured fixed headlights, with a front fascia very similar to the contemporary Honda Legend coupe and Honda Accord of the same time period. It also featured chrome trim on the headlights front and rear bumpers, side moldings, tail lights and both front and rear windscreens to enhance the focus on luxury rather than sportiness. The Prelude INX coincided with changes to North American lighting requirements in the United States and Canada, and a greater focus on safety was offered with available anti-lock brakes and optional driver's side airbag exclusively offered on the Si/SR/S models.

In the US, the facelifted Prelude debuted for the 1990 model year, with the carbureted 2.0S model being discontinued. The fuel-injected 2.0Si became the entry-level model, being supplanted by a new Si model with the B21A1 engine, with Si 4WS or Si ALB (ABS) as optional trim models. The revised version of the B20A5, called the B21A1 was available. This causes premature piston ring wear contributing to exceptionally high oil consumption.

For the Canadian market, the S, SR and SR 4WS models were introduced for 1990. In 1991, SR ALB and SE models were introduced. The SE model was closer to the JDM and EDM models in that it was fully optioned with leather interior and was equipped with both 4WS and ALB.

Prelude SiStates and Prelude SiTCV 
Honda released two new special limited edition trim models in Japan in 1989 for the facelift Prelude, the Prelude SiStates and Prelude SiTCV. These cars were a limited production run and very few were built. SiStates catalogues indicate 3,000 built. They both featured standard 4WS, ALB, Viscous limited-slip differential (LSD) transmissions, TCS (SiTCV only), leather-wrapped steering wheel and gear lever, extra sound-deadening insulation on the firewall and hood, and many more features that were usually options. Two major distinctions of the SiStates was that it was the same width as the Prelude sold in North America, from which it took its name, due to the wider side moldings. The other being that it was over 2.0 liters, a limitation in engine displacement in Japan for insurance reasons. The extra width and the larger engine combined to place the Prelude SiStates in a considerably higher tax bracket; while this slowed sales it also targeted some status hungry buyers. The SiStates model was only available with the MY8A LSD equipped automatic transmission. The SiTCV model was available with the MY8A automatic or the D2E4 5-speed manual transmission.

Fourth generation (1991)

On 19 September 1991, the fourth-generation Prelude was introduced in Japan, and in Europe from early 1992. The car had a 58% front and 42% rear weight distribution. The four-wheel steering system was changed to an electronic version and the 4-cylinder engine was increased in displacement from 2.1 liters to 2.2 liters for the base model "S" (SOHC F22A1 engine,  at 5,200 rpm,  at 4,000 rpm) and "VTEC" model (DOHC VTEC H22A1,  at 6,800 rpm,  at 5,500 rpm), with a 2.3-liter for the "Si" (DOHC H23A1,  at 5,800 rpm,  at 5,300 rpm). The Japanese Si came with the F22B (2.2 L DOHC non-VTEC). The VTEC model had an upgraded brake system, going from a 10.3-inch (262 mm) front rotor to an 11.1-inch (282 mm) front rotor and utilizing larger brake caliper and pads, similar to those found in the Honda Vigor. Its styling approach is similar to the Honda Ascot Innova during the same time period.

In some countries, the Prelude with 2.2 DOHC VTEC 4-cylinder engine was called the VTi-R. Later, the '96 prelude Si/SR was introduced with a 2.3 DOHC 4-cylinder engine. In Canada, the Si was called the SR, and the VTEC was called the SR-V. Due to the width dimensions and the engine displacement exceeding Japanese government regulations for vehicles classified as "compact", this generation Prelude obligated Japanese owners to yearly taxes.

This model also marked the end for the pop-up headlights. The 1992 Prelude incorporated other design features that had also become the "Prelude standard".  The rear end was rounded and fairly high in comparison to the previous square trunk line.  The front fascia of the car became wider with fixed headlights. The glass moonroof made way for a steel sliding sunroof which no longer retracted into the car but extended out and over it.

The light blue back lighting introduced in the third generation was continued. Later models (1994 and on) also featured translucent speedometer and tachometer needles. All VTEC & SE models received leather interior. Also featured was an 8-speaker audio system (Gathers DSP 8-speaker System) which included a center dash-mounted speaker and rear center subwoofer, while the U.S. version received only 7 speakers (center dash speaker not included). The Japanese version also included a digital climate control system. The Canadian version received some options which were not available in the United States.  For instance, the Japanese Prelude had power folding mirrors as well as a rear windscreen wiper, while the Canadian market was the one to have heated mirrors and optional heated seats.  The Japanese model came with optional Honda Access accessories such as Typus ski racks, under dash lights, headrest covers, a cabin air filter, and floor mats. Some of the Japanese domestic market fourth-generation Prelude VTECs did not come with options such as a sunroof and 4-wheel steering, as it was possible to skip these options when buying in Japan. The fourth-generation Prelude also shares some suspension components with the fifth-generation (1994–97) Honda Accord.

Models and markets

F1 Safety Car
The Prelude was used in Formula One as its Safety Car during the 1994 Japanese Grand Prix.

Fifth generation (1996)

Introduced on 7 November 1996, the fifth generation retained an FF layout with an independent front suspension and 63/37 weight distribution. Most fifth-generation Honda Preludes came with  aluminum alloy wheels with all-season 205/50 R16 87V tires, featured the 11.1-inch front brakes like the 1996 VTEC model, and most Preludes also received a 5-lug hub (not the 4-lug wheel hub of older models). The Prelude was only available in three models for Canada and two models for the US (the Base and Type SH). All models came with 16-inch alloy wheels and a 200HP (203 PS) 2.2-liter DOHC VTEC 4-cylinder engine. The 2.0i and JDM Si trims came with 195/60 R15 steel wheel, and the JDM Xi came with 14-inch steel wheels. Unlike the North American market Preludes, JDM Preludes came with rear windscreen wipers, except for the Xi. Australian and JDM Preludes weigh less than American and European models: VTi-R manual weighs , autos weigh , and the ATTS weighs . The ATTS model received Honda's Active Torque Transfer System; the equivalent model was called the Type S in Japan, VTi-S in Europe, and Type SH ("Super Handling") in North America. ATTS was designed to counteract the understeer inherent in a front-wheel drive car, but the Prelude's 63.1 percent front weight distribution was too much for the system to successfully mask.

The fifth-generation Prelude marked a return to the more square bodystyle of the third generation (1987–1991), in an attempt to curb slumping sales of the fourth-generation bodystyle. All models and trim packages stayed within the BB-chassis code (BB5-BB9) and housed either an H-series or F-Series engine:

1999 refresh 
For the 1999 model year, the Prelude received a mid-cycle refresh; this included a  increase in power for manual ( from ) and automatic ( from ) transmission models, a new front grille featuring a small "Prelude" badge, an access door to the cabin air filtration system allowing for cabin air filter replacement without modifications, and changes to available colours.

Canadian market 
Canadian-market Preludes were very similar to US models, although all were equipped with heated seats as standard equipment, and received a 4.5-liter washer fluid reservoir in place of the smaller 2.5-liter US spec. In 2001, Canada received a replacement for the Type SH, the SE trim level. The SE was mechanically identical to base models, but it came equipped with perforated, heated leather seats, Type SH Enkei rims, Type SH spoiler, a leather-wrapped shift knob, and simulated carbon fiber trim kit on the door panels and audio panel. The SE did not receive body colored side skirts as standard like the Type SH, and also did not feature the active torque transfer system (ATTS). Dealer accessories for Canadian vehicles included: carbon fiber audio panel, sunroof visor, 6-disc-in-dash CD changer, trunk mounted CD changer, cassette player, roof rack, gold plated emblem kit, gold plated exhaust finisher, leather shift knob, full and half nose mask, security system, and a cargo mat.

Japanese-exclusive Type S 

One version of the fifth generation Prelude, a high-performance model called the Type S, was only available in Japan. It was equipped with the 2.2 L H22A, featuring VTEC and producing  at 7,200 rpm and 163 lbf·ft (221 N·m) at 6,500 rpm. With a compression ratio of 11.0:1,  bore x  stroke and VTEC-valve timing, lift and duration were adjusted to  intake and  exhaust. Honda also overhauled the air box and replaced it with a more efficient design that is often referred to as Dynamic Chambering, along with a larger throttle body design bored to 62 mm (as opposed to the previous 60 mm). The exhaust system was also treated to a redesign, with the pipe cross sections becoming more cylindrical rather than oval. In addition to a higher output engine Type S and like all ATTS equipped Preludes featured an overhauled front suspension layout which offered a more effective camber curve. The Type S, has an electronically controlled torque vectoring system attached to the manual transmission dubbed by Honda the Active Torque Transfer System (ATTS). The gearing on the Type S matches most other fifth-generation Preludes equipped with a manual transmission, excluding the five-speed 2.2 VTi VTEC which has a final drive ratio of 4.266:1. The Type S has an Active Control ABS system, different from the others which have the standard ABS systems. The interior featured newly developed synthentic materials called Cabron and Excene to upholster the seats which most people perceive as leather and Alcantara laced with red stitching. Manufacturer styling options included seat lettering. The exterior styling of fifth generation Preludes was standardized for most models. All had a sunroof except for the Japanese Type S, Xi trim and some BB9s.

Prelude Motegi 
Honda also released a special edition fifth-generation Prelude, called Motegi. The name of this special edition derives from the 'twin-ring Motegi' motor-racing circuit, located in Haga District, Tochigi, Japan. This track was built in 1997 by Honda as part of their effort to bring the IndyCar series to Japan.

The Motegi edition Prelude featured an OEM Honda body kit, 17-inch Honda alloy wheels, lowered sports suspension and a Motegi badge on the trunk lid. All of these items, with the exception of the trunk lid badge, were optional on non-Motegi models.

Sales
Sales weakened beginning with the third generation Prelude, particularly due to competition from Honda's other offerings. The sixth-generation Accord coupe received an exclusive front fascia, rear tail lights, wheels and many other body panels, now being marketed alongside the Prelude with shared brochures in Canada, yet its sedan roots gave it much more utility than the comparatively cramped Prelude, and the option of a V6 engine gave North American buyers an appealing alternative. The sixth-generation Civic Si coupe was considerably less expensive than the Prelude as well, while also providing better fuel economy ratings. The Honda S2000 was another offering that while more expensive than the Prelude, offered rear wheel drive, a six-speed transmission, 40 extra horsepower, and a convertible top. The exterior dimensions of the Prelude were no longer in compliance with Japanese government regulations, and the additional costs resulting from this contributed to the popularity of smaller Honda products. US sales figures below.

Safety

Australia
In Australia, the safety performance of Honda Preludes manufactured between 1983 and 2001 was assessed in the Buyers Guide to used Car Safety Ratings 2006, which was published by the Roads & Traffic Authority (a New South Wales, Australia, government agency).  This publication concluded that the level of occupant protection in Preludes from 1983 to 1996 was at an "average" level, while in Preludes from 1997 to 2001 is "significantly better than average."

U.S.
The National Highway Traffic Safety Administration in the United States has determined frontal crash test ratings of Honda Preludes of different model years.

Awards
The Prelude was on Car and Driver magazine's annual Ten Best list ten times: three times from 1984 to 1986, and then seven times from 1992 to 1998, although the biggest complaint over much of the Prelude's lifespan was the lack of availability of a V-6 engine option, especially in the US.

Convertibles

Through the years, several German and US companies have converted Preludes into convertibles. There have been convertibles made from the first, second and fourth generation Preludes.

First generation Preludes were modified into full convertibles by several companies in both the US, Canada and Germany. The 
Solaire Corporation, a company in Santa Ana California owned by Al Rowland & Jim Bruemmer, led the idea for mass market sales. He brought in craftsman Bruce Meyers (Known for the famous Meyers Manx Dune Buggy) to help design the tooling and fiberglass work for production. A believed 250 Preludes, between 1980 - 1982, were modified and sold to US Honda dealerships with full factory warranties. Dealer prices ranged from $14,000-$15,000, while the conversion itself sold around $5,000. Solaire collaborated with other companies including Classic Touch, Con-tec, Silcco, Steas Industries and National Coach. It was marketed as "Honda's 450 SL", drawing aesthetic comparisons to the Mercedes 450SL.

Tropic Design, located in Crailsheim, Germany. Company owner Jürgen Weber learned this trade in the United States. In all, they modified 47 Preludes. Very few have remained in Europe, initially all in Germany. Some have been sold over time to nearby countries, at least one to the Netherlands, one to France and one to Belgium.

Second generation Preludes were modified by another German company; some 100 Preludes were modified. No DOHC engine-equipped models have been known to be converted into convertibles, however. Three versions were available: a basic version, one which had more luxurious options, and one which added a body kit.

There is believed to be a few third generation preludes made however it is not confirmed how many were made. There is currently one confirmed Japanese imported third generation convertible Prelude currently in Australia though not much is known of its history.

Of the fourth generation Preludes, only some 15 were modified into a convertible by German company Honda-Autohaus Manfred Ernst. No details are known about the engine types and other specifics. Since only 15 were ever made, they are assumed by many to be custom-built.

References

External links 
 
 

Prelude
Coupés
Front-wheel-drive sports cars
Sport compact cars
Vehicles with four-wheel steering
1980s cars
1990s cars
2000s cars
Cars introduced in 1978